Verna railway station (Station code: VEN) is a railway station in Nagoa – Cansaulim Road, Verna, Salcete, South Goa, Goa.

Other stations
It falls under Karwar railway division of Konkan Railway zone, a subsidiary zone of Indian Railways.
under the jurisdiction of Konkan Railway.

Location
It lies is in Verna village near Cansaulim and is nearby Madgaon (Margao) railway station in South Goa district is the largest Konkan Railway station within Goa, while Thivim or Tivim railway station in North Goa comes at second place. The former is a gateway to South Goa, Margao, the urban area of Vasco da Gama and also the beaches of South Goa, while the latter is a gateway to Mapusa town, the emigration-oriented sub-district of Bardez and also the North Goa beach belt.  The Karmali railway station is closest State capital Panjim or Panaji, which is the administrative capital of Goa.

References

External links
Photos of Verna railway station, via Flickr.com

Railway stations in South Goa district
Railway stations opened in 1998
Karwar railway division